Rasmus Ankersen (born 22 September 1983 in Herning, Denmark) is an author, public speaker, director of football at Southampton Football Club  and president of Göztepe S.K.

He is the co-founder and CEO of Sport Republic, the major shareholder of Premier League club Southampton and TFF First League club Göztepe S.K..

Ankersen was Director of Football at Brentford F.C. between 2015 and 2020. He also has a part-time role as chairman of Danish Superliga club FC Midtjylland.

Published work 
Ankersen has published several books, including; A Winner's DNA, Mid-level DNA, Education of a Winner, The Gold Mine Effect, and Hunger in Paradise with Danish publisher Turbulenz.

In his books he draws on experiences traveling around the world to live with, work with and inspect some of the world's best talent environments in sports.  Due to the popularity of his books, he has been dubbed a 'high performance expert'.

The attention gained from his written work has led to many high-profile public speeches, appearing in popular media outlets CNN & Sky.

Early football career 
Ankersen had a short career as a professional football player with FC Midtjylland in Denmark, before suffering a serious knee injury in his first senior game.  He then studied for UEFA's A Licence, and became the assistant-coach for the under-17 team at a club.

He remained on the coaching staff until departing to travel the world as part of the research for his published works.

He later returned to take up the role of chairman.  The club was subsequently purchased by Matthew Benham, who also owns Brentford FC.

Brentford FC 
Ankersen was appointed as co-director of football at Brentford FC in the summer of 2015, along with Phil Giles.  Their responsibility is to oversee the football operations of the club as well as being responsible for managing the recruitment of new players and technical staff.

Of his appointment, Ankersen stated: "I am convinced that this is the start of a journey to something special at Brentford Football Club." He stepped down in December 2021 before taking over as Director of Football at Southampton in January 2022 as part of a takeover by London-based sport investment company Sports Republic, which Ankersen is the CEO of.

Sport Republic 
Ankersen is the CEO and co-founder of Sport Republic - a London-based sport investment company.

References

Danish sports coaches
Living people
1983 births
FC Midtjylland
Brentford F.C. non-playing staff
People from Herning Municipality
Southampton F.C. directors and chairmen